Romulea melitensis is a species of plant in the family Iridaceae. It is endemic to Malta.

Sources

References 

Endemic flora of Malta
melitensis
Flora of Malta